This is a list of films which have placed number one at the weekly box office in France during 1994. Amounts are in French franc.

Number one films

Highest-grossing films

References

See also
 List of French films of 1994
 Lists of box office number-one films

1994
France
1994 in French cinema